Alpino was the name of at least four ships of the Italian Navy and may refer to:

 , a  launched in 1909 and discarded in 1928.
 , a  launched in 1938 and sunk in 1943.
 , an  launched in 1967 and decommissioned in 2006.
 , a Bergamini (2011)-class frigate launched in 2014.

Italian Navy ship names